Marris is a surname. Notable people with the surname include:
Charles Allan Marris (1876–1947), New Zealand journalist and editor
Emma Marris (born 1979), American non-fiction writer
Georgia Marris (born 1996), New Zealand swimmer
Rob Marris (born 1955), British politician
William Sinclair Marris (1873–1945), British civil servant, colonial administrator, and classical scholar

See also 
Maris (disambiguation)
Marri (disambiguation)

English-language surnames